Worapeerachayakorn Kongphopsarutawadee (born 20 February 1999), formerly known as Yodsaphat Pakham, is a Thai beach volleyball player. She won the gold medal at the 2021 Asian Beach Volleyball Championships.

References

External links
 
 

1999 births
Living people
Worapeerachayakorn Kongphopsarutawadee
Place of birth missing (living people)